Islam in Mauritius is the nation's third largest religion behind Hinduism and Christianity. Muslims constitute over 17.3 per cent of Mauritius population. Muslims of Mauritius are mostly of Indian descent. Large numbers of Muslims arrived to Mauritius during the British regime starting in 1834 as part of the large scale indentured labor force from India.

Mauritius became independent in 1968 and no official religion is defined in the constitution. Hindus make up about half of the population;  Christians about a third and Muslims most of the rest.  Several religious groups including Muslim ones are recognized by parliamentary decree and receive state subsidies according to their percentage of the population.

History

Some scholars believed that Muslims arrived in Mauritius with the Dutch as slaves from Arabia, but this view has been disproved as the Arabians who were with the Dutch were mostly traders. Muslims arrived in Mauritius during the British regime, starting in 1810. Indentured labourers arrived on a large scale from India, mostly from Bihar, Uttar Pradesh, Orissa, Bengal, and the cities of Kolkata and Mumbai. There were a total of 450,000 immigrants during the period from 1835 to 1907, and after 1909, the immigration of indentured labourers stopped. They were brought from India for a period of five years, after which they were returned. By 1922, only 160,000 had returned to India, while others settled down in Mauritius. There were a few families of wealthy Muslim traders from Gujarat which also settled along with the majority poor working classes. The population of Muslims is rumoured to have been 33% (no reference) of the total population during 1835, 64% during 1861 (no reference), but allegedly reduced to less than 25% by 1909. Traditionally Sunnis remained a majority, while other groups like Sunni Shafia, Shia and Bohra formed around 20 per cent of the total Muslims in the country. Cocknies, Kodjas, Bohras and Aga-khanities are believed to have arrived in Mauritius during 1910 from East Africa. Tawheed ideology, which was commonly followed in Mauritius was replaced by Islamic Circle Religious Group which culled out religious practices from India. The trend was changed after the evolution of oil-rich Arab countries in the 1970s.

Communities
{| style="clear:right; float:right; background:#ffffff; margin: 0 0 0.5em 1em;" class="toccolours" width="250" font-size : "90%"
|-
!style="background:#A8BDEC" align="center" colspan=2|Religious census
|-
|style="text-align:center;background:#A8BDEC"|Faith||style="text-align:center;background:#A8BDEC"| Total %
|-
|Hinduism||style="text-align:center;" |48
|-
|Roman Catholic||style="text-align:center;" |26
|-
|Islam||style="text-align:center;" |17
|-
|Other Christian||style="text-align:center;" |6
|-
|Others||style="text-align:center;" |3
|-
| colspan="2" |* Others - Buddhism, Animist & others'
|-
| colspan="2" |* Other Christian - Seventh-day Adventists, Anglicans, Pentecostals, Presbyterians, Evangelicals, Jehovah's Witnesses, The Church of Jesus Christ of Latter-day Saints, and Assemblies of God|-
|}

The largest group of Muslims are the Sunnis, comprising around 80 per cent of the population. Sunnis are divided among various factions such as the Salafis, the Sufis, the Tawhidis and the Tabligh jamaat. While the majority adheres to the Hanafi school of thoughts, there are other factions that follow the Shafe'i school of thought. There are also Muslims who follow Shi'ism. Meimons are a small aristocratic group, who control the Jummah Mosque in Port Louis. Shiaties form a small community of around 3 per cent of the total population. One of the subgroups are called Cocknies, who are believed to have arrived as boat builders from Cochin in India. Creole Lascars are a new subgroup, who have intermarried with Cocknies or other communities.

Within the Muslim community, there are three distinct ethnic groups that exist, notably the Memons and the Surtees (who are rich merchants who came from Kutch and Surat province of Gujarat in India), then the "Hindi Calcattias" who came to Mauritius as indentured labourer from Bihar. Creole is the most used language among Muslims other than Arabic and Urdu, while other languages spoken include Bhojpuri, and Gujarati.

Government policies

Mauritius received independence during 1968 and there was no state religion in Mauritius defined in the constitution. The nation had no indigenous population nor any indigenous tribes or religion. The religious organizations present at the time of independence, namely, Roman Catholic Church, Church of England, Presbyterian Church, Seventh-day Adventist, Hindus and Muslims are recognized by parliamentary decree. The constitution and other laws protect freedom of religion. The groups recognized by the government before independence receive an annual sum for paying their adherents. The government allows overseas missionary groups to operate on a case-by-case basis, although there are no rules that prohibit proselytizing activities. The missionaries should obtain both residence permit and work permit to operate, which is provided for a maximum of three years, without any extension. There are lot of government holidays, most of which are religious indicating the heterogeneity of religions. As per the International Religious Freedom report of 2012 published by the United States Department of States, there were no incidence of religious abuses. The report also indicates other religions claim that Hindus have a majority in the government, while Hindus have sought a policy for anti-conversion.

Mosques and administration
As of 1965, there were 65 mosques in the country. The first purpose-built mosque in Mauritius is the Camp des Lascars Mosque in around 1805. It is now officially known as the Al-Aqsa Mosque. 

The Jummah Mosque in Port Louis was built in the 1850s and is described in the Ministry of Tourism's guide as one of the most beautiful religious buildings in Mauritius. 

All mosques are controlled by a board called waqf, also a form of charitable organization. The Waqf Board in Mauritius was created in 1941 and it supervises the finances and administration of all the mosques. Each mosque has a manager named muttanwalli, elected by a congregation. The board helps executing funerals, imparting education in madraasas'' and all Islamic ceremonies. Major holidays like Bakrid, Eid, Mawlid and, for the Shia only, Muharram  are celebrated with floats in the major mosques in the country.

Notable Muslims
 Abdoollatiff Osman, 1st Minister of Agriculture
 Abdool Raman Osman, 1st Mauritian Governor General
 Ameenah Gurib, 2nd Muslim President of Mauritius
 Cassam Uteem, 1st Muslim President of Mauritius
 Raouf Bundhun, Vice President of Mauritius
 Abdool Razack Mohamed, Minister of Housing & Lands
 Mustapha Beeharry , Imam, Social Worker, MP
 Abdallah Goolamallee , Lecturer, Social Worker, Entrepreneur
 Parwez Kureemun

Notes

References

External links
 Islamic revivalism and political opposition among minority Muslims in Mauritius

 
Mauritius